First Desires or Premier Desirs (original French title) is a 1984 French/West German film and the last film directed by photographer David Hamilton.

Summary
An erotic film from photographer David Hamilton. Three young girls come of age on a remote Mediterranean island after they are shipwrecked. Each girl follows her own path; whether it be with local boys, the husband of a beautiful pianist, or another female.

Availability
This film is available on DVD in the UK. In 2012 it was released on the Criterion Collection's Hulu channel.

Stills
Many images from the film First Desires appear in Hamilton's collections, including Twenty Five Years of an Artist.

References

External links
 

1984 films
1980s French-language films
French coming-of-age films
1980s erotic drama films
Films directed by David Hamilton
French erotic drama films
Erotic romance films
1984 drama films
1980s French films